The Kardomah Gang,The Kardomah Boys, or Kardomah Group was a group of bohemian friends – artists, musicians, poets and writers – who, in the 1930s, frequented the Kardomah Café in Castle Street, Swansea, Wales.

Members of the Gang

Regular members of the Gang included poets Charles Fisher, Dylan Thomas, Bert Trick, John Prichard and Vernon Watkins, composer and linguist Daniel Jones, artists Alfred Janes and Mervyn Levy, Mabley Owen and Tom Warner.

The Kardomah Café

The café was located opposite the offices of the South Wales Evening Post newspaper where Thomas and Fisher worked. This was where the group drank coffee and discussed many subjects including Einstein, Epstein, Garbo, Stravinsky, death, religion and Picasso.

In a letter, dated 26 May 1934 to Pamela Hansford Johnson, Dylan Thomas writes about their first meeting in the Kardomah Café:

I'm in a dreadful mess now. I can hardly hold the pencil or hold the paper. This has been coming for weeks. And the last four days have completed it. I'm absolutely at the point of breaking now. You remember how I was when I said goodbye to you for the first time. In the Kardomah when I loved you so much and was too shy to tell you.

The Blitz 

In February 1941, Swansea was heavily bombed by the Luftwaffe, in a 'Three Nights Blitz'. Castle Street was just one of the many streets in Swansea that suffered badly; the rows of shops, including the 'Kardomah Café', were destroyed.

After the bombing, Dylan Thomas came back to visit Swansea.  He later wrote about the devastation in his radio play entitled Return Journey to Swansea. In the play, he describes the café as being "Razed to the snow".

Relocation of Kardomah Café 

The Kardomah Café reopened after the war in a new location in Portland Street, a short walk from where the original stood. The café's Castle Street site was originally the site of the Congregational church where Dylan Thomas's parents married in 1903.

Recollections of the cafe and people who met there were recorded by Fisher and are available at kardomahgroup.net 
"My recollections of the place date from the year I started working for the Post (1934?) Dylan, briefly a reporter at the same time as myself, was in the process of leaving the paper and preparing his assault on literary London. (But he and I were in the habit of meeting there even before then, in Grammar School days (see: Bishop Gore School) when editing the school magazine was used as a pretext for cutting classes)"  etc...

References

External links
Piece that appeared in the Independent about the Kardomah occasioned by the death of the last surviving member, Charles Fisher, in 2006: 
BBC Wales documentary on The Kardomah Boys, broadcast in 1997 

Arts in Wales
Organisations based in Swansea
People from Swansea
Mass media and culture in Swansea